Lamar Ashby "Skeeter" Newsome (October 18, 1910 —  August 31, 1989) was an American shortstop in Major League Baseball who played for the Philadelphia Athletics (1935–39), Boston Red Sox (1941–45) and Philadelphia Phillies (1946–47).

Born in Phenix City, Alabama, he finished 27th in voting for the  American League MVP Award after playing in 114 games and having 449 at-bats, 48 runs, 119 hits, 21 doubles, 2 triples, 1 home run, 22 RBI, 5 stolen bases, 21 walks, .265 batting average, .301 on-base percentage, .327 slugging percentage, 147 total bases and 8 sacrifice hits.

He finished 32nd in voting for the 1945 AL MVP for playing in 125 games and having 438 at-bats, 45 runs, 127 hits, 30 doubles, 1 triple, 1 home run, 48 RBI, 6 stolen bases, 20 walks, .290 batting average, .322 on-base percentage, .370 slugging percentage, 162 total bases and 17 sacrifice hits.

In 12 seasons he played in 1,128 games and had 3,716 at-bats, 381 runs, 910 hits, 164 doubles, 15 triples, 9 home runs, 292 RBI, 67 stolen bases, 246 walks, .245 batting average, .293 on-base percentage, .304 slugging percentage, 1,131 total bases and 120 sacrifice hits.

Newsome managed in the minor leagues for the Phillies and Detroit Tigers after his playing career ended. He died in Columbus, Georgia, at the age of 78.

References

External links

1910 births
1989 deaths
Baseball players from Alabama
Beaumont Exporters players
Birmingham Barons managers
Boston Red Sox players
Decatur Commodores players
Evansville Hubs players
Major League Baseball shortstops
Philadelphia Athletics players
Philadelphia Phillies players
Portland Pilots baseball players
Schenectady Blue Jays players
Seattle Rainiers players
Talladega Indians players
Terre Haute Phillies players
Tulsa Oilers (baseball) players
Wilmington Blue Rocks (1940–1952) players
Syracuse Chiefs managers